The 1935 European Championship can refer to European Championships held in several sports:

 1935 European Rugby League Championship
 Eurobasket 1935
 1935 Grand Prix season